Juan Manuel Falcón Jiménez (born 24 February 1989) is a Venezuelan retired professional footballer who played as a striker.

Club career

Portuguesa FC 
His first steps in professional football were in Portuguesa FC, where he started playing as a midfielder. Later on, he passed over several field positions until reaching the forward spot.

Falcón scored his first professional goal in a Copa Venezuela match against Zamora FC, which eventually would be his last destination in the local league after a small period in Trujillanos FC.

Zamora 
With Zamora, he won the league two times in a row and he became the top goalscorer in the league with 19 goals.

FC Metz
In mid 2014, he signed a three-year contract with French team FC Metz, in a transfer reported to be around €800,000. He left the club in 2016.

Retirement
After two years without a club, Falcón confirmed on 17 January 2020, that he had retired at the age of 30 due to a knee injury.

International career
He made his debut on 23 March 2008, coming as a substitute against El Salvador.

Honours

Club
Trujillanos
Copa Venezuela: 2010

Zamora
Venezuelan Primera División: 2012–13, 2013–14

Individual
Venezuelan Primera División top goalscorer: 2013–14, 19 Goals

References

External links
 

1989 births
Living people
Venezuelan footballers
Venezuelan expatriate footballers
Venezuela international footballers
Association football forwards
Portuguesa F.C. players
Llaneros de Guanare players
A.C.C.D. Mineros de Guayana players
Trujillanos FC players
Zamora FC players
FC Metz players
Al-Fateh SC players
Independiente Santa Fe footballers
Asociación Civil Deportivo Lara players
Ligue 1 players
Saudi Professional League players
Categoría Primera A players
Venezuelan expatriate sportspeople in France
Venezuelan expatriate sportspeople in Saudi Arabia
Venezuelan expatriate sportspeople in Colombia
Expatriate footballers in France
Expatriate footballers in Saudi Arabia
Expatriate footballers in Colombia
People from Acarigua
20th-century Venezuelan people
21st-century Venezuelan people